Jowzdan (also Romanized as Jowzdān and Jūzdān; also known as Jazūn) is a city in the Central District of Najafabad County, Isfahan Province, Iran.  At the 2006 census, its population was 6,393, in 1,561 families.

History 
With 800 years of history, Jowzdan is one of the oldest cities in Isfahan province. The historians argue that the stones found in town’s masjid belong to Timurid empire era.

The story behind the town’s formation happens when people of Gorg Abad which is small town near Kooh Panji in Zagros mountains faced a huge threat from wolves in that area and started refuging to start a new town.

Religious sights 

References

Populated places in Najafabad County

Cities in Isfahan Province